Sipuleucel-T, sold under the brand name Provenge, developed by Dendreon Pharmaceuticals, LLC, is a cell-based cancer immunotherapy for prostate cancer (CaP). It is an autologous cellular immunotherapy.

Medical uses 
Sipuleucel-T is indicated for the treatment of metastatic, asymptomatic or minimally symptomatic, metastatic castrate-resistant hormone-refractory prostate cancer (HRPC).  Other names for this stage are metastatic castrate-resistant (mCRPC) and androgen independent (AI) or (AIPC). This stage leads to mCRPC with lymph node involvement and distal (distant) tumors; this is the lethal stage of CaP. The prostate cancer staging designation is T4,N1,M1c.

Treatment method 

A course of treatment consists of three basic steps:
 The patient's white blood cells, primarily dendritic cells, a type of antigen-presenting cells (APCs), are extracted in a leukapheresis procedure.
 The blood product is sent to a production facility and incubated with a fusion protein (PA2024) consisting of two parts:
 The antigen prostatic acid phosphatase (PAP), which is present in 95% of prostate cancer cells and
 An immune signaling factor granulocyte-macrophage colony stimulating factor (GM-CSF) that helps the APCs to mature.
 The activated blood product (APC8015) is returned from the production facility to the infusion center and reinfused into the patient.

Premedication with acetaminophen and antihistamine is recommended to minimize side effects.

Side effects
Common side effects include: bladder pain; bloating or swelling of the face, arms, hands, lower legs, or feet; bloody or cloudy urine; body aches or pain; chest pain; chills; confusion; cough; diarrhea; difficult, burning, or painful urination; difficulty with breathing; difficulty with speaking up to inability to speak; double vision; sleeplessness; and inability to move the arms, legs, or facial muscles.

Society and culture

Legal status 
Sipuleucel-T was approved by the U.S. Food and Drug Administration (FDA) on April 29, 2010, to treat asymptomatic or minimally symptomatic metastatic HRPC.

Shortly afterward, sipuleucel-T was added to the compendium of cancer treatments published by the National Comprehensive Cancer Network (NCCN) as a "category 1" (highest recommendation) treatment for HRPC. The NCCN Compendium is used by Medicare and major health care insurance providers to decide whether a treatment should be reimbursed.

Research

Clinical trials

Completed 
Sipuleucel-T showed overall survival (OS) benefit to patients in three double-blind randomized phase III clinical trials, D9901, D9902a, and IMPACT.

The IMPACT trial served as the basis for FDA licensing. This trial enrolled 512 patients with asymptomatic or minimally symptomatic metastatic HRPC randomized in a 2:1 ratio. The median survival time for sipuleucel-T patients was 25.8 months comparing to 21.7 months for placebo-treated patients, an increase of 4.1 months.  31.7% of treated patients survived for 36 months vs. 23.0% in the control arm.  Overall survival was statistically significant (P=0.032). The longer survival without tumor shrinkage or change in progression is surprising. This may suggest the effect of an unmeasured variable.  The trial was conducted pursuant to a FDA Special Protocol Assessment (SPA), a set of guidelines binding trial investigators to specific agreed-upon parameters with respect to trial design, procedures and endpoints; compliance ensured overall scientific integrity and accelerated FDA approval.

The D9901 trial enrolled 127 patients with asymptomatic metastatic HRPC randomized in a 2:1 ratio. The median survival time for patients treated with sipuleucel-T was 25.9 months comparing to 21.4 months for placebo-treated patients. Overall survival was statistically significant (P=0.01).

The D9902a trial was designed like the D9901 trial but enrolled 98 patients. The median survival time for patients treated with sipuleucel-T was 19.0 months comparing to 15.3 months for placebo-treated patients, but did not reach statistical significance.

Ongoing 
As of August 2014, the PRO Treatment and Early Cancer Treatment (PROTECT) trial, a phase IIIB clinical trial started in 2001, was tracking subjects but no longer enrolling new subjects. Its purpose is to test efficacy for patients whose CaP is still controlled by either suppression of testosterone by hormone treatment or by surgical castration. Such patients have usually failed primary treatment of either surgical removal of the prostate, (EBRT), internal radiation, BNCT or (HIFU) for curative intent. Such failure is called biochemical failure and is defined as a PSA reading of 2.0 ng/mL above nadir (the lowest reading taken post primary treatment).

As of August 2014, a clinical trial administering sipuleucel-T in conjunction with ipilimumab (Yervoy) was tracking subjects but no longer enrolling new subjects; the trial evaluates the clinical safety and anti-cancer effects (quantified in PSA, radiographic and T cell response) of the combination therapy in patients with advanced prostate cancer.

References

Further reading

External links 
 

Cancer treatments
Prostate cancer